Paso Córdova is a village of General Roca municipality in Río Negro Province in Argentina.

References

Populated places in Río Negro Province